Kathryn Gallagher (born July 23, 1993) is an American singer and actress best known for her portrayal of Bella Fox in the Broadway musical Jagged Little Pill, for which she received a Grammy Award for Best Musical Theater Album and a nomination for the Tony Award for Best Featured Actress in a Musical.

Early life and education 
Gallagher was born in New York, daughter of Peter Gallagher and Paula Harwood. She moved to Los Angeles at 11 years old, where she began to study theatre at the Adderley School. She also started seriously writing her own music when she was in middle school. She identifies as bisexual.

She attended University of Southern California's Thornton School of Music.

Career 
Gallagher's song "Nothing Ever None" was featured on the soundtrack for the 2011 film Someday This Pain Will Be Useful to You, and her song "Damaged" appears on the 2012 film Thanks for Sharings soundtrack. Gallagher has released four solo EPs of her original music. She released her debut EP, I'm Fine, in 2014 and her second, American Spirit, in 2015. She released three singles in 2019 and 2020. In 2020, Gallagher released her third and fourth EPs, Demos, Vol. 1 and Demos, Vol. 2, which she produced by herself in her family house in the woods of Connecticut during the coronavirus pandemic. Gallagher has done many live shows where she performs her music in Los Angeles and New York City.

Gallagher made her Broadway debut as the Voice of Martha in Deaf West Theatre's 2015 Broadway revival of Spring Awakening, also serving as the show's dance captain. She auditioned for the part after a suggestion from fellow theatre actor Ben Platt.

Gallagher has done several television projects, her most notable role being Annika in the Lifetime series You, in which she appeared in eight episodes of Season One. Gallagher also guest starred on The Flash and Indoor Boys.

In 2019, Gallagher joined the cast of Jagged Little Pill on Broadway in the role of Bella Fox. She was an original Broadway cast member. The Daily Beasts review of the show said Gallagher was "excellent in a truly tough part", while Deadline Hollywood noted that she "brings the focus of the many-issued musical to its most powerful note". In the show, she sings an original Alanis Morissette song, "Predator" that was created for the musical when Gallagher's part was upgraded from a featured ensemble role to a principal role. On October 15, 2020, Gallagher was nominated for the Tony Award for Best Featured Actress in a Musical, her first Tony nomination.  The show began previews on Broadway in November 2019, opened on December 5, 2019, and closed on December 17, 2021 due to the COVID-19 pandemic.

Acting credits

Theater

Film

Televisie

Music video appearances

Discography

Extended plays

Singles

Cast album appearances
Jagged Little Pill (Original Broadway Cast Recording) (2019)

Songwriting credits
"Wanna Wear a Dress" by Harper Grae (2019)

Awards and nominations

References

21st-century American actresses
21st-century American singers
21st-century American women singers
American musical theatre actresses
Grammy Award winners
Living people
1993 births